Peter Sterry (1613 –  19 November 1672) was an English independent theologian, associated with the Cambridge Platonists prominent during the English Civil War era. He was chaplain to Parliamentarian general Robert Greville, 2nd Baron Brooke and then Oliver Cromwell, a member of the Westminster Assembly, and a leading radical Puritan preacher attached to the English Council of State. He was made fun of in Hudibras.

Life
He was born in Surrey. He went to St. Olave's Grammar School, Southwark. He was a Fellow of Emmanuel College, Cambridge, from 1636, where he had studied since 1629; but gave up the fellowship quite soon.

He preached to Parliament on important occasions: in 1649 after the surrender of Drogheda and Waterford, in 1651 after the battle of Worcester. His sermons, widely allusive, were considered opaque: David Masson quotes a contemporary opinion:

After the Restoration, he retired to a community in East Sheen. He took part in preaching, for example at Hackney and conventicles.

Literary historian Vivian de Sola Pinto observes that Sterry "had exactly the qualities that Puritans like Bunyan lacked: intellectual freedom, flexibility of mind, imagination, tolerance and loving-kindness." Sterry "united with this tenderness a wide culture, a true humanist's delight in learning and a love of beauty in all its manifestations."

He is commemorated by a stained glass window in the chapel of Emmanuel College, which has an archive of unpublished writings.

Views

Described as a 'Platonizing Puritan', an 'Origenian universalist,' as well as a Behmenist (despite disagreeing with Böhme on much), he was a follower of leading Cambridge Platonist Benjamin Whichcote. As a mystic, he spoke of 'hidden music'. A millenarian, he expected in the early 1650s the Second Coming shortly, with 1656 a decisive year.

He with William Erbery 'had difficulty in distinguishing themselves from Ranters'; but he wrote against Ranter 'errors'. He was a sympathiser with early Quakerism, and preached in their defence when James Nayler was under attack by MPs at the parliament of 1656.

Robin Parry summarizes: "In many ways Sterry is an anomaly—a Puritan who was a lover of the arts and poetry, a Platonist who was a theological determinist, a deeply rational mystic, and a Calvinist universalist."

The following excerpt exemplifies Sterry's thought and style quite well:The divine love covers all things with the divine loveliness and beauty of the universal harmony, which is the righteousness of God in Christ, the first, the fairest image of the invisible God, in which every other image of God stands, as in the original, the all-comprehending glory.

Family

The Oxford academic Nathaniel Sterry was his younger brother.

Works
The Spirit Convincing of Sinne, fast sermon for Parliament, 26 November 1645
England's Deliverance from the Northern Presbytery, Compared with its Deliverance from the Roman Papacy (1652) sermon on the Battle of Worcester
 Way of God with his people in these nations, sermon for Parliament 5 November 1656
Free Grace Exalted (1670)
A Discourse of the Freedom of the Will (1675)
The Rise, Race, and Royalty of the Kingdom of God in the Soul (1683)
The Appearance of God to Man in the Gospel (1710)

References
 F. J. Powicke, "Peter Sterry: A Puritan Mystic." Primitive Methodist Quarterly Review 47 (1905): 617–25.
Vivian de Sola Pinto (1968) Peter Sterry, Platonist and Puritan, 1613–1672;: A biographical and critical study with passages selected from his writings
V. de Sola Pinto, Peter Sterry and His Unpublished Writings, The Review of English Studies, Vol. 6, No. 24 (Oct. 1930), pp. 385–407
Nabil I. Matar (1994), Peter Sterry: Select Writings
Matar, "Peter Sterry and the Comenian Circle: Education and Eschatology in Restoration Nonconformity," The Journal of the United Reformed Church History Society, 5 (1994): 183–192.
Matar, "Aristotelian Tragedy in the Theology of Peter Sterry," Literature and Theology, 6 (1992): 310–20.
Matar, "'Oyle of Joy': The Early Prose of Peter Sterry," Philological Quarterly, 71 (1992): 31–46.
Matar, "John Donne, Peter Sterry and the ars moriendi," Exploration in Renaissance Culture, 17 (1991): 55–71.
Matar, "Peter Sterry and the Puritan Defense of Ovid in Restoration England," Studies in Philology, 88 (1991): 110–121.
Matar, "Peter Sterry and the 'Paradise Within': A Study of the Emmanuel College Letters," Restoration, 13 (1989): 76–85.
Matar, "Peter Sterry and Jacob Boehme," Notes and Queries, 231 (1986): 33–36.
Matar, "Peter Sterry and the First English Poem on the Druids," National Library of Wales Journal, 24 (1985): 222–243.
Matar, "Peter Sterry and the Ranters," Notes and Queries, 227 (1982): 504–506.
Matar, "Peter Sterry and the 'lovely Society' at West Sheen," Notes and Queries, 227 (1982): 45–46,
Matar, "Peter Sterry, the Millennium and Oliver Cromwell," The Journal of the United Reformed Church History Society, 2 (1982): 334–343.
Matar, "A Note on George Herbert and Peter Sterry," George Herbert Journal, 5 (1982): 71–75.
Matar, "Peter Sterry and Morgan Llwyd," The Journal of the United Reformed Church History Society, 2 (1981): 275–279.
Matar, "The Peter Sterry MSS at Emmanuel College, Cambridge," Transactions of the Cambridge Bibliographical Society, 8 (1981): 42–56. With P. J.Croft.

Notes

External link

1613 births
1672 deaths
Westminster Divines
English theologians
People educated at St Olave's Grammar School
Fellows of Emmanuel College, Cambridge
Cambridge Platonists
Alumni of Emmanuel College, Cambridge
English male non-fiction writers